Justice Lloyd G. Williams Q.C. (June 16, 1927—January 16, 2008) was a barrister in Jamaica, then a Supreme Court Justice for Eastern Caribbean Islands and later a Chief Justice on the International Tribunals Rwanda from 1999 to 2004 in Tanzania. He is also the father of actress Tonya Williams.

Personal life 
Williams, Lloyd George was born on June 16, 1927, in Kingston, Jamaica. Son of Stanford Albert and Gwendolyn Estenia (Grant) Williams. He was married to Korah Williams June 13, 1957, divorced 1974. They had a daughter born July 12, 1958, named Tonya Williams. In 1984, Williams remarried Cynthia Alethea Williams.

Career 
He began his career as a Barrister-at-Law in 1959 in England and later entered private practice in Jamaica before becoming Director of Public Prosecutions in Antigua from 1978-1982 and Solicitor General, Antigua in 1982. From 1983 to 1992, he was High Court Judge of the Eastern Caribbean Supreme Court. Judge Williams was appointed Queen's Counsel in 1981 by Her Majesty Queen Elizabeth II for distinguished service in the field of law. Judge Williams chaired several Commissions and Statutory Authorities in Jamaica as well as being a member of the Prison Law Reform Committee in Jamaica. Judge Williams was admitted to practice at the English Bar, the Jamaican Bar, the Antiguan Bar and the Cayman Islands Bar.

Education 
Williams studied at the Fisk University in Nashville from 1949 to 1950, then at McGill University in Montreal from 1952 and the Inns of Court School of Law at the Middle Temple British law firm  from 1954 to 1957. Then in the summer of 1958 he did an in-depth course at the Hague Academy for International Law.

References 

1927 births
2008 deaths
20th-century Jamaican judges
Jamaican judges of international courts and tribunals
Solicitors general
Eastern Caribbean Supreme Court justices